The Old Market, Hove is a historic (grade II listed) building on the border of Brighton and Hove in England. It has served various functions, currently operating as a cultural performance centre under the name "TOMThe Old Market".

History
The Old Market opened in 1828 as a covered marketplace for sales of meat, fish and vegetables. It supplied the residential development of Brunswick, which was originally independent from Brighton and Hove village. As Brighton and Hove have grown up around it, the building has catered for changing needs, operating as a riding academy and stables, warehouse and, since the 1980s, as an arts venue. Established as Old Market Arts Centre (OMAC), the initial arts venture entered difficulties.

The building was renovated in 1998 by The Old Market Trust with a lottery grant of over four million pounds, as a home for The Hanover Band and a community arts venue for Brighton and Hove. Its current owners in 2010, Yes/No Productions made various changes in order to maximise potential use for gigs, theatre productions, events and performances after purchasing the building for £800,000. In 2011 the building was reopened under the new name TOMThe Old Market.

Programming
As TOMThe Old Market, a wide variety of performances and events have been programmed. Artists such as Django Django, Guillemots, James Rhodes and Jonathan Wilson have played. Comedians Daniel Kitson, Simon Munnery, Isy Suttie, Jonny Sweet have performed, along with many others as part of Brighton Comedy Festival. Theatre and events are also hosted. The building is a venue in both Brighton Fringe and Brighton Festival during May.

A monthly photography talk is held there, called MiniClick.

See also
Grade II listed buildings in Brighton and Hove: N–O

References

External links
 
 
 VisitBrighton page

Buildings and structures in Brighton and Hove
Grade II listed buildings in East Sussex
1828 establishments in England
Music venues in East Sussex
Buildings and structures completed in 1828
Theatres in England
Hove